Devanāgarī or Devanagari, also called Nāgarī, is a left-to-right abugida (a type of segmental writing system), based on the ancient Brāhmī script, used in the northern Indian subcontinent. It is one of the official scripts of the Indian Republic. It was developed and in regular use by the 7th century CE. The Devanāgarī script, composed of 47 primary characters, including 14 vowels and 33 consonants, is the fourth most widely adopted writing system in the world, being used for over 120 languages.

The orthography of this script reflects the pronunciation of the language. Unlike the Latin alphabet, the script has no concept of letter case. In a cursory look, the Devanāgarī script appears different from other Indic scripts such as Bengali-Assamese, or Gurmukhi, but a closer examination reveals they are very similar except for angles and structural emphasis.

Among the languages using it as a primary or secondary script are Marathi, Pāḷi, Sanskrit (the ancient Nāgarī script for Sanskrit had two additional consonant characters), Hindi, Boro, Nepali, Sherpa, Prakrit, Apabhramsha, Awadhi, Bhojpuri, Braj Bhasha, Chhattisgarhi, Haryanvi, Magahi, Nagpuri, Rajasthani, Bhili, Dogri, Kashmiri, Konkani, Sindhi, Nepal Bhasa, Mundari, and Santali. The Devanāgarī script is closely related to the Nandināgarī script commonly found in numerous ancient manuscripts of South India, and it is distantly related to a number of southeast Asian scripts.

Etymology 
Hence,  can be translated as "from the abode of divinity".

The use of the name  emerged from the older term . According to Fischer, Nāgarī emerged in the northwest Indian subcontinent around 633 CE, was fully developed by the 11th century CE, and was one of the major scripts used for the Sanskrit literature.

History 
Devanāgarī is part of the Brahmic family of scripts of India, Nepal, Tibet, and Southeast Asia. It is a descendant of the 3rd century BCE Brāhmī script, which evolved into the Nagari script which in turn gave birth to Devanāgarī and Nandināgarī. Devanāgarī has been widely adopted across India and Nepal to write Sanskrit, Marathi, Hindi, Central Indo-Aryan languages, Konkani, Boro, and various Nepalese languages.

Some of the earliest epigraphic evidence attesting to the developing Sanskrit Nāgarī script in ancient India is from the 1st to 4th century CE inscriptions discovered in Gujarat. Variants of script called , recognisably close to Devanāgarī, are first attested from the 1st century CE Rudradaman inscriptions in Sanskrit, while the modern standardised form of Devanāgarī was in use by about 1000 CE. Medieval inscriptions suggest widespread diffusion of Nāgarī-related scripts, with biscripts presenting local script along with the adoption of Nāgarī scripts. For example, the mid 8th-century Pattadakal pillar in Karnataka has text in both Siddha Matrika script, and an early Telugu-Kannada script; while, the Kangra Jawalamukhi inscription in Himachal Pradesh is written in both Sharada and Devanāgarī scripts.

The Nāgarī script was in regular use by the 7th century CE, and it was fully developed by about the end of first millennium. The use of Sanskrit in Nāgarī script in medieval India is attested by numerous pillar and cave-temple inscriptions, including the 11th-century Udayagiri inscriptions in Madhya Pradesh, and an inscribed brick found in Uttar Pradesh, dated to be from 1217 CE, which is now held at the British Museum. The script's prototypes and related versions have been discovered with ancient relics outside India, in places such as Sri Lanka, Myanmar and Indonesia. In East Asia, the  script (considered as the closest precursor to Nāgarī) was in use by Buddhists. Nāgarī has been the primus inter pares of the Indic scripts. It has long been used traditionally by religiously educated people in South Asia to record and transmit information, existing throughout the land in parallel with a wide variety of local scripts (such as Moḍī, Kaithi, and Mahajani) used for administration, commerce, and other daily uses.

Sharada remained in parallel use in Kashmir. An early version of Devanāgarī is visible in the Kutila inscription of Bareilly dated to VS 1049 (992 CE), which demonstrates the emergence of the horizontal bar to group letters belonging to a word. One of the oldest surviving Sanskrit texts from the early post-Maurya period consists of 1,413 Nāgarī pages of a commentary by Patanjali, with a composition date of about 150 BCE, the surviving copy transcribed about 14th century CE.

East Asia 

In the 7th century, under the rule of Songtsen Gampo of the Tibetan Empire, Thonmi Sambhota was sent to Nepal to open marriage negotiations with a Nepali princess and to find a writing system suitable for the Tibetan language. He then invented the Tibetan script based on the Nāgarī used in Kashmir. He added 6 new characters for sounds that did not exist in Sanskrit.

Other scripts closely related to Nāgarī (such as Siddhaṃ) were introduced throughout East and Southeast Asia from the 7th to the 10th centuries CE: notably in Indonesia, Vietnam, and Japan.

Most of the Southeast Asian scripts have roots in Dravidian scripts, but a few found in south-central regions of Java and isolated parts of southeast Asia resemble Devanāgarī or its prototypes. The Kawi script in particular is similar to the Devanāgarī in many respects, though the morphology of the script has local changes. The earliest inscriptions in the Devanāgarī-like scripts are from around the 10th century CE, with many more between the 11th and 14th centuries. Some of the old-Devanāgarī inscriptions are found in Hindu temples of Java, such as the Prambanan temple. The Ligor and the Kalasan inscriptions of central Java, dated to the 8th century, are also in the Nāgarī script of north India. According to the epigraphist and Asian Studies scholar Lawrence Briggs, these may be related to the 9th century copper plate inscription of Devapaladeva (Bengal) which is also in early Devanāgarī script. According to anthropologists and Asian studies scholars John Norman Miksic and Goh Geok Yian, the 8th century version of early Nāgarī or Devanāgarī script was adopted in Java, Bali, and Khmer around the 8th–9th centuries, as evidenced by the many contemporaneous inscriptions of this period.

Letters 
The letter order of Devanāgarī, like nearly all Brāhmic scripts, is based on phonetic principles that consider both the manner and place of articulation of the consonants and vowels they represent. The format of Devanāgarī for Sanskrit serves as the prototype for its application, with minor variations or additions, to other languages.

Vowels 
The vowels and their arrangement are:

In a New Indo-Aryan language such as Hindi the distinction is formal: the  indicates vowel nasalisation while the  indicates a homorganic nasal preceding another consonant: e.g.,   "laughter",   "the Ganges". Some writers and typesetters dispense with the "moon" stroke altogether, using only the dot in all situations.
 The    (usually transliterated with an apostrophe) is a Sanskrit punctuation mark for the elision of a vowel in sandhi:   ( ←   +  ) ("this one"). An original long vowel lost to coalescence is sometimes marked with a double :   ( ←   +  ) "always, the self". In Hindi,  states that its "main function is to show that a vowel is sustained in a cry or a shout":  .
   is not an actual phoneme of Sanskrit, but rather a graphic convention included among the vowels in order to maintain the symmetry of short–long pairs of letters.
IAST transliteration is not defined.

Consonants 
The table below shows the consonant letters (in combination with inherent vowel ) and their arrangement. To the right of the Devanāgarī letter it shows the Latin script transliteration using International Alphabet of Sanskrit Transliteration, and the phonetic value (IPA) in Hindi.

 Beyond the Sanskritic set, new shapes have rarely been formulated.  offers the following, "In any case, according to some, all possible sounds had already been described and provided for in this system, as Sanskrit was the original and perfect language. Hence it was difficult to provide for or even to conceive other sounds, unknown to the phoneticians of Sanskrit". Where foreign borrowings and internal developments did inevitably accrue and arise in New Indo-Aryan languages, they have been ignored in writing, or dealt through means such as diacritics and ligatures (ignored in recitation).
 The most prolific diacritic has been the subscript dot . (Although    could also exist, it is not used in Hindi.)
For a list of all 297 (33×9) possible Sanskrit consonant-short vowel syllables see .

Vowel diacritics 

Table: Consonants with vowel diacritics. Vowels in their independent form on the top and in their corresponding dependent form (vowel sign) combined with the consonant '' on the bottom. '' is without any added vowel sign, where the vowel '' is inherent.

A vowel combines with a consonant in their diacritic form. For example, the vowel  combines with the consonant  to form the syllabic letter , with halant (cancel sign) removed and added vowel sign which is indicated by diacritics. The vowel  combines with the consonant  to form  with halant removed. But the diacritic series of  ... is without any added vowel sign, as the vowel अ (a) is inherent. The transliteration of each combination will appear on mouseover.

Conjunct consonants 

As mentioned, successive consonants lacking a vowel in between them may physically join as a conjunct consonant or ligature. When Devanāgarī is used for writing languages other than Sanskrit, conjuncts are used mostly with Sanskrit words and loan words. Native words typically use the basic consonant and native speakers know to suppress the vowel when it is conventional to do so. For example, the native Hindi word  is written . The government of these clusters ranges from widely to narrowly applicable rules, with special exceptions within. While standardised for the most part, there are certain variations in clustering, of which the Unicode used on this page is just one scheme. The following are a number of rules:
 24 out of the 36 consonants contain a vertical right stroke (etc.). As first or middle fragments/members of a cluster (when letters are to be written as half pronounced), they lose that stroke. e.g.  +  =  ,  +  =  ,  +  =  .
   as a first member takes the form of a curved upward dash above the final character or its  diacritic. e.g. Elsewhere as a final member it is a diagonal stroke extending leftwards and down. e.g. .   is shifted up to make the conjunct  .

Accent marks 

The pitch accent of Vedic Sanskrit is written with various symbols depending on shakha. In the Rigveda,  is written with a bar below the line,  with a stroke above the line while  is unmarked.

Punctuation 
The end of a full verse may be marked with a double-, a "" symbol. Punctuation marks of Western origin, such as the colon, semicolon, exclamation mark, dash, and question mark have been in use in Devanāgarī script since at least the 1900s, matching their use in European languages.

Old forms 

The following letter variants are also in use, particularly in older texts.

Numerals

Fonts 
A variety of Unicode fonts are in use for Devanāgarī. These include Akshar, Annapurna, Arial, CDAC-Gist Surekh, CDAC-Gist Yogesh, Chandas, Gargi, Gurumaa, Jaipur, Jana, Kalimati, Kanjirowa, Lohit Devanagari, Mangal, Kokila, Raghu, Sanskrit2003, Santipur OT, Siddhanta, and Thyaka.

The form of Devanāgarī fonts vary with function. According to Harvard College for Sanskrit studies: 

The Google Fonts project has a number of Unicode fonts for Devanāgarī in a variety of typefaces in serif, sans-serif, display and handwriting categories.

Transliteration 

There are several methods of Romanisation or transliteration from Devanāgarī to the Roman script.

Hunterian system 

The Hunterian system is the national system of romanisation in India, officially adopted by the Government of India.

ISO 15919 

A standard transliteration convention was codified in the ISO 15919 standard of 2001. It uses diacritics to map the much larger set of Brāhmic graphemes to the Latin script. The Devanāgarī-specific portion is nearly identical to the academic standard for Sanskrit, IAST.

IAST 
The International Alphabet of Sanskrit Transliteration (IAST) is the academic standard for the romanisation of Sanskrit. IAST is the de facto standard used in printed publications, like books, magazines, and electronic texts with Unicode fonts. It is based on a standard established by the Congress of Orientalists at Athens in 1912. The ISO 15919 standard of 2001 codified the transliteration convention to include an expanded standard for sister scripts of Devanāgarī.

The National Library at Kolkata romanisation, intended for the romanisation of all Indic scripts, is an extension of IAST.

Harvard-Kyoto 
Compared to IAST, Harvard-Kyoto looks much simpler. It does not contain all the diacritic marks that IAST contains. It was designed to simplify the task of putting large amount of Sanskrit textual material into machine readable form, and the inventors stated that it reduces the effort needed in transliteration of Sanskrit texts on the keyboard. This makes typing in Harvard-Kyoto much easier than IAST. Harvard-Kyoto uses capital letters that can be difficult to read in the middle of words.

ITRANS 
ITRANS is a lossless transliteration scheme of Devanāgarī into ASCII that is widely used on Usenet. It is an extension of the Harvard-Kyoto scheme. In ITRANS, the word  is written "devanaagarii" or "devanAgarI". ITRANS is associated with an application of the same name that enables typesetting in Indic scripts. The user inputs in Roman letters and the ITRANS pre-processor translates the Roman letters into Devanāgarī (or other Indic languages). The latest version of ITRANS is version 5.30 released in July 2001. It is similar to Velthuis system and was created by Avinash Chopde to help print various Indic scripts with personal computers.

Velthuis 

The disadvantage of the above ASCII schemes is case-sensitivity, implying that transliterated names may not be capitalised. This difficulty is avoided with the system developed in 1996 by Frans Velthuis for TeX, loosely based on IAST, in which case is irrelevant.

ALA-LC Romanisation 
ALA-LC romanisation is a/ transliteration scheme approved by the Library of Congress and the American Library Association, and widely used in North American libraries. Transliteration tables are based on languages, so there is a table for Hindi, one for Sanskrit and Prakrit, etc.

WX 

WX is a Roman transliteration scheme for Indian languages, widely used among the natural language processing community in India. It originated at IIT Kanpur for computational processing of Indian languages. The salient features of this transliteration scheme are as follows.
 Every consonant and every vowel has a single mapping into Roman. Hence it is a prefix code, advantageous from computation point of view.
 Lower-case letters are used for unaspirated consonants and short vowels, while capital letters are used for aspirated consonants and long vowels. While the retroflex stops are mapped to 't, T, d, D, N', the dentals are mapped to 'w, W, x, X, n'. Hence the name 'WX', a reminder of this idiosyncratic mapping.

Encodings

ISCII 
ISCII is an 8-bit encoding. The lower 128 codepoints are plain ASCII, the upper 128 codepoints are ISCII-specific.

It has been designed for representing not only Devanāgarī but also various other Indic scripts as well as a Latin-based script with diacritic marks used for transliteration of the Indic scripts.

ISCII has largely been superseded by Unicode, which has, however, attempted to preserve the ISCII layout for its Indic language blocks.

Unicode 

The Unicode Standard defines four blocks for Devanāgarī: Devanagari (U+0900–U+097F), Devanagari Extended (U+A8E0–U+A8FF), Devanagari Extended-A (U+11B00–11B5F), and Vedic Extensions (U+1CD0–U+1CFF).

Devanāgarī keyboard layouts

InScript layout 
InScript is the standard keyboard layout for Devanāgarī as standardized by the Government of India. It is inbuilt in all modern major operating systems. Microsoft Windows supports the InScript layout (using the Mangal font), which can be used to input unicode Devanāgarī characters. InScript is also available in some touchscreen mobile phones.

Typewriter 
This layout was used on manual typewriters when computers were not available or were uncommon. For backward compatibility some typing tools like Indic IME still provide this layout.

Phonetic 

Such tools work on phonetic transliteration. The user writes in the Latin alphabet and the IME automatically converts it into Devanāgarī. Some popular phonetic typing tools are Akruti, Baraha IME and Google IME.

The Mac OS X operating system includes two different keyboard layouts for Devanāgarī: one resembles the INSCRIPT/KDE Linux, while the other is a phonetic layout called "Devanāgarī QWERTY".

Any one of the Unicode fonts input systems is fine for the Indic language Wikipedia and other wikiprojects, including Hindi, Bhojpuri, Marathi, and Nepali Wikipedia. While some people use InScript, the majority uses either Google phonetic transliteration or the input facility Universal Language Selector provided on Wikipedia. On Indic language wikiprojects, the phonetic facility provided initially was java-based, and was later supported by Narayam extension for phonetic input facility. Currently Indic language Wiki projects are supported by Universal Language Selector (ULS), that offers both phonetic keyboard (Aksharantaran, Marathi: ,) and InScript keyboard.

The Ubuntu Linux operating system supports several keyboard layouts for Devanāgarī, including Harvard-Kyoto, WX notation, Bolanagari and phonetic. The 'remington' typing method in Ubuntu IBUS is similar to the Krutidev typing method, popular in Rajasthan. The 'itrans' method is useful for those who know English (and the English keyboard) well but are not familiar with typing in Devanāgarī.

See also 

 Languages of India
 Clip font
 Devanāgarī transliteration
 Devanāgarī Braille
 ISCII
 Nagari Pracharini Sabha
 Nepali
 Schwa deletion in Indo-Aryan languages
 Shiksha – the Vedic study of sound, focusing on the letters of the Sanskrit alphabet

References

Citations

General sources 
 .
 .
 .
 
 .
 .
 .

Census and catalogues of manuscripts in Devanāgarī 
Thousands of manuscripts of ancient and medieval era Sanskrit texts in Devanāgarī have been discovered since the 19th century. Major catalogues and census include:

 , Medical Hall Press, Princeton University Archive
 , Vol 1: Upanishads, Friedrich Otto Schrader (Compiler), University of Michigan Library Archives
 A preliminary list of the Sanskrit and Prakrit manuscripts, Vedas, Sastras, Sutras, Schools of Hindu Philosophies, Arts, Design, Music and other fields, Friedrich Otto Schrader (Compiler), (Devanagiri manuscripts are identified by Character code De.)
 Catalogue of the Sanskrit Manuscripts, Part 1: Vedic Manuscripts, Harvard University Archives (mostly Devanāgarī)
 Catalogue of the Sanskrit Manuscripts, Part 4: Manuscripts of Hindu schools of Philosophy and Tantra, Harvard University Archives (mostly Devanāgarī)
 Catalogue of the Sanskrit Manuscripts, Part 5: Manuscripts of Medicine, Astronomy and Mathematics, Architecture and Technical Science Literature, Julius Eggeling (Compiler), Harvard University Archives (mostly Devanāgarī)
 , Part 6: Poetic, Epic and Purana Literature, Harvard University Archives (mostly Devanāgarī)
 David Pingree (1970–1981), Census of the Exact Sciences in Sanskrit: Volumes 1 through 5, American Philosophical Society, Manuscripts in various Indic scripts including Devanāgarī

External links 

 Devnagari Unicode Legacy Font Converters 
 Digital Nāgarī fonts, University of Chicago
 Devanāgarī in different fonts, Wazu, Japan (Alternate collection: Luc Devroye's comprehensive Indic Fonts , McGill University)
 , Rudradaman's inscription in Sanskrit Nāgarī script from 1st through 4th century CE (coins and epigraphy), found in Gujarat, India, pages 30–45
 Numerals and Text in Devanāgarī , 9th century temple in Gwalior Madhya Pradesh, India, Current Science
 

 
Articles containing video clips
Brahmic scripts
Hindi
Hindustani orthography
Officially used writing systems of India